The 1995 Women's Pak Fah Yeow World Open Squash Championship was the women's edition of the 1995 World Open, which serves as the individual world championship for squash players. The event took place in Hong Kong between 23 June and 26 June 1995. Michelle Martin won her third World Open title, defeating Sarah Fitzgerald in the final.

Seeds

Draw and results

Notes
Michelle Martin won her third consecutive title, the third game dropped in the quarter finals to Sue Wright was the first Martin had lost since losing the 1992 final to Susan Devoy.

See also
World Open
1995 Men's World Open Squash Championship

References

External links
Womens World Open

1995 in squash
World Squash Championships
1995 in Hong Kong sport
Squash tournaments in Hong Kong
1995 in women's squash
International sports competitions hosted by Hong Kong
1995 in Hong Kong women's sport